Acianthus exiguus, commonly known as tiny mosquito orchid, is a flowering plant in the orchid family Orchidaceae and is endemic to New South Wales in Australia. It is a terrestrial herb with a single, heart-shaped leaf and up to five translucent greenish-white flowers with pinkish markings and is found growing in forests on the north coast of the state.

Description
Acianthus exiguus is a terrestrial, perennial, deciduous, sympodial herb with a single heart-shaped, glabrous, dark green leaf which is light reddish-purple on its lower surface.

The central vein extends about  beyond the end of the labellum. The thick, fleshy callus covering most of the central area is green and has many small pimple-like papillae on the outer half. Flowering occurs from May to June.

This species is distinguished from other mosquito orchids by its small, greenish, semi-erect flowers and narrow, purplish labellum.

Taxonomy and naming
Acianthus exiguus was first formally described by David Jones in 1991 and the description was published in Australian Orchid Research from specimens found near Wardell. The specific epithet (exiguus) is a Latin word meaning "small", "little" or "petty".  In a 1995 paper published in the journal Allertonia, Paul Kores claimed that A. exiguus and 3 other species are not distinct from A. fornicatus and should be regarded as a synonyms. That position has been adopted by Plants of the World Online.

Ecology
The flowers of this species, unlike those of other mosquito orchids, are self-pollinating.

Distribution and habitat
This orchid grows in localised populations between Repton and Wardell in the North Coast region of New South Wales. It grows in sandy soil and clay loam in tall, moist forest and rainforest.

Conservation
Acianthus exiguus has a ROTAP rating of 3RC-, indicating that it is uncommon.

References

External links 
 

exiguus
Orchids of New South Wales
Endemic orchids of Australia
Plants described in 1991
Taxa named by David L. Jones (botanist)